The Beggars is a 1962 Brazilian drama film directed by Flávio Migliaccio. It was entered into the 3rd Moscow International Film Festival.

Cast
 Vanja Orico
 Oswaldo Loureiro
 Ruy Guerra
 Fábio Sabag

References

External links
 

1962 films
1962 drama films
1960s Portuguese-language films
Brazilian drama films
Brazilian black-and-white films